Augustus Ludlow Case (February 3, 1812 – February 16, 1893) was a rear admiral in the United States Navy who served during the American Civil War.

Biography
Born in Newburgh, New York, Case was appointed midshipman in 1828.

He participated in the Wilkes Expedition of 1837–1842 which explored the South Seas and discovered the Antarctic Continent.

During the Mexican–American War, he held the town of Palisada with 25 men against the Mexican cavalry for two weeks to block the escape of General Santa Ana. He also participated in the Paraguay expedition of 1859.

In the Civil War he was Fleet Captain of the North Atlantic Blockading Squadron in its capture of Forts Clark and Hatteras in August 1861. From 1869 to 1873 he was Chief of the Bureau of Ordnance, attaining the rank of rear admiral on May 24, 1872. From 1873 to 1875, he commanded the European Squadron, and the combined European, North and South Atlantic Squadrons assembled at Key West in 1874.

Admiral Case retired in 1875, and died in Washington in 1893. His grave site is located in Island Cemetery, Newport, Rhode Island.

Namesake
Two ships have been named  for him.

See also

References

 

1812 births
1893 deaths
United States Navy rear admirals
People of New York (state) in the American Civil War
Union Navy officers
Burials at Common Burying Ground and Island Cemetery
People from Newburgh, New York
People of the United States Exploring Expedition